The inland taipan (Oxyuranus microlepidotus), also commonly known as the western taipan, the small-scaled snake or the fierce snake, is a species of extremely venomous snake in the family Elapidae. The species is endemic to semi-arid regions of central east Australia. Aboriginal Australians living in those regions named the snake dandarabilla. It was formally described by Frederick McCoy in 1879 and then by William John Macleay in 1882, but for the next 90 years it was a mystery to the scientific community; no further specimens were found, and virtually nothing was added to the knowledge of this species until its rediscovery in 1972.

Based on the median lethal dose value in mice, the venom of the inland taipan is by far the most toxic of any snake – much more so than even that of sea snakes – and it has the most toxic venom of any reptile when tested on human heart cell culture. The inland taipan is a specialist hunter of mammals, so its venom is specially adapted to kill warm-blooded species. It is estimated that one bite possesses enough lethality to kill at least 100 fully grown humans. It is an extremely fast and agile snake that can strike instantly with extreme accuracy,  often striking multiple times in the same attack, and it envenomates in almost every case.

Although the most venomous and a capable striker, in contrast to the coastal taipan which many experts cite as an extremely dangerous snake due to its behavior when it encounters humans, the inland taipan is usually a quite shy and reclusive snake, with a placid disposition, and prefers to escape from trouble. However, it will defend itself and strike if provoked, mishandled, or prevented from escaping. Because it lives in such remote locations, the inland taipan seldom comes in contact with people; therefore it is not considered the deadliest snake in the world overall, especially in terms of disposition and human deaths per year. The word "fierce" from its alternative name describes its venom, not its temperament.

Taxonomy

The inland taipan would have been known to Aboriginal Australians 40,000–⁠60,000 years ago and is well known to them today. To the Aboriginal people from the place now called Goyder Lagoon in north-east South Australia, the inland taipan was called Dandarabilla.

The inland taipan first came to the attention of Western science in 1879. Two specimens of the fierce snake were discovered in the junction of the Murray and Darling Rivers in northwestern Victoria and described by Frederick McCoy, who called the species Diemenia microlepidota, or small-scaled brown snake. In 1882 a third specimen was found near Bourke, New South Wales, and William John Macleay described the same snake under the name Diemenia ferox (thinking it was a different species). No more specimens were collected until 1972. In 1896 George Albert Boulenger classified both as belonging to the same genus, Pseudechis (black snakes), referring them as Pseudechis microlepidotus and Pseudechis ferox.

In 1956, relying only on published descriptions and notes, James Roy Kinghorn regarded ferox as a synonym for microlepidotus and proposed the genus Parademansia. In 1963 Eric Worrell considered Parademansia microlepidotus and Oxyuranus scutellatus (coastal taipan, named simply "taipan" in those days) to be the same species.

In September 1972, after receiving an unclassified snake head sample from a grazier from one of the Channel Country stations west of Windorah of the far southwest Queensland, herpetologists Jeanette Covacevich (then working for the Queensland Museum) and Charles Tanner travelled to the site and found 13 living specimens, and rediscovered the lost snake Parademansia microlepidotus. In 1976 Jeanette Covacevich and John Wombey argued that Parademansia microlepidotus belongs to a distinct genus, and this was also the opinion of Harold Cogger.

Covacevich, McDowell, Tanner & Mengden (1981) successfully argued, by comparing anatomical features, chromosomes and behaviours of the two species then known as Oxyuranus scutellatus (taipan) and Parademansia microlepidota, that they belonged in a single genus.  Oxyuranus (1923), the more senior name, was adopted for the combined genus.

Oxyuranus microlepidotus has been the fierce snake's binomial name since the early 1980s. The generic name Oxyuranus is from Greek oxys "sharp, needle-like", and ouranos "an arch" (specifically the arch of the heavens) and refers to the needle-like anterior process on the arch of the palate. The specific name microlepidotus means "small-scaled" (Latin). Hence the common name, "small-scaled snake". Since it has been determined (Covacevich et al., 1981) that the fierce snake (formerly: Parademansia microlepidota) is actually part of the genus Oxyuranus (taipan), another species, Oxyuranus scutellatus, which was previously known simply as the "taipan" (coined from the aboriginal snake's name Dhayban), was renamed the "coastal taipan" (or "eastern taipan"), while the now newly classified Oxyuranus microlepidotus became commonly known as the "inland taipan" (or "western taipan").

Distribution and habitat
The inland taipan inhabits the black soil plains in the semi-arid regions where Queensland and South Australia borders converge.

In Queensland, the snake has been observed in Channel Country region (e.g., Diamantina National Park, Durrie Station, Morney Plains Station and Astrebla Downs National Park) and in South Australia it has been observed in the Marree-Innamincka NRM District (e.g., Goyder Lagoon Tirari Desert, Sturt Stony Desert, Coongie Lakes, Innamincka Regional Reserve and Oodnadatta).  An isolated population also occurs near Coober Pedy, South Australia.

There are two old records for localities further south-east, i.e., the junction of the Murray and Darling Rivers in northwestern Victoria (1879) and Bourke, New South Wales, (1882); however the species has not been observed in either state since then.

Conservation status
Like every Australian snake, the inland taipan is protected by law.

Conservation status for the snake has been assessed for the IUCN Red List for the first time in July 2017, and in 2018 designated as least concern, stating "This species is listed as Least Concern, as it is widespread and overall it is not considered to be declining. Although the impact of potential threats requires further research, these are likely to be localized within the snake's range."

The inland taipan's conservation status has also been designated by Australian official sources:
 South Australia: (Outback regional status) least concern.
 Queensland: Rare (pre 2010), near-threatened (May 2010-December 2014), least concern (December 2014 – present day).
 New South Wales: Presumed extinct. Based on criteria "hasn't been recorded in its habitat...despite surveys in a time frame appropriate to their life cycle and type".
 Victoria: Regionally extinct. Based on criteria "As for Extinct but within a  defined region  (in this case the state of Victoria)  that does not encompass the entire geographic range of the taxon. A taxon is presumed Regionally Extinct when exhaustive surveys in known and/or expected habitat,  at appropriate times  (diurnal,  seasonal,  annual),  throughout the region have failed to record an individual.  Surveys should be over a  time frame appropriate to the taxon’s life cycle and life form." The Australian Museum lists it as presumed extinct.

In captivity 
According to the International Species Information System (retrieved 2004), inland taipans are held in three zoo collections: the Adelaide Zoo and Sydney Taronga Zoo in Australia and Moscow Zoo in Russia. In the Moscow Zoo they are kept in the "House of Reptiles" which is not usually open to the general public.

The inland taipan is also on public display in Australia at the Australia Zoo, Australian Reptile Park, Billabong Sanctuary, Cairns Tropical Zoo, Lone Pine Koala Sanctuary and Shoalhaven Zoo.

The snake is also on display at several locations outside of Australia:

In the United States, inland taipans are held at the Dallas Zoo, at Reptile Gardens South Dakota, at Kentucky Reptile Zoo and at Animal World & Snake Farm Zoo in Texas.

In Europe inland taipans are held in Sweden at the Stockholm Skansen zoo and Gothenburg Universeum and in the UK at the London Zoo. Amateur zoo listings also report the snake in tropicarium park Jesolo Italy, in Gifttierhaus Eimsheim, Welt der Gifte Greifswald  and TerraZoo Rheinberg Germany, in Lausanne vivarium Lausanne Switzerland, in Randers Tropical Zoo Denmark, in Plzeň Zoo Czech Republic and in Reptilienzoo Nockalm Patergassen Austria.

In Asia inland taipans are held in Singapore Zoo.

Private ownership law 
In New South Wales, private ownership of an inland taipan is legal only with the highest venomous class reptile licence.

Description

The inland taipan is dark tan, ranging from a rich, dark hue to a brownish light-green, depending on season. Its back, sides and tail may be different shades of brown and grey, with many scales having a wide blackish edge. These dark-marked scales occur in diagonal rows so that the marks align to form broken chevrons of variable length that are inclined backward and downward. The lowermost lateral scales often have an anterior yellow edge. The dorsal scales are smooth and without keels. The round-snouted head and neck are usually noticeably darker than the body (glossy black in winter, dark brown in summer), the darker colour allowing the snake to heat itself while exposing only a smaller portion of the body at the burrow entrance. The eye is of average size with a blackish brown iris and without a noticeable coloured rim around the pupil.

It has 23 rows of dorsal scales at midbody, between 55 and 70 divided subcaudal scales, and one anal scale.

Its fangs are between 3.5 and 6.2 mm long (shorter than those of the coastal taipan).

Seasonal adaptation
Inland taipans adapt to their environment by changing the colour of the skin during seasonal changes. They tend to become lighter during summer and darker during the winter. This seasonal colour change serves the purpose of thermoregulation, allowing the snake to absorb more light in the colder months.

Breeding
Inland taipan produce clutches of between one dozen and two dozen eggs. The eggs hatch two months later. The eggs are usually laid in abandoned animal burrows and deep crevices. Reproduction rate depends in part on their diet: if there is not enough food, then the snake will reproduce less.

Captive snakes generally live for 10 to 15 years. An inland taipan at the Australia Zoo lived to be over 20 years old.

Feeding
In the wild, the inland taipan consumes only mammals, mostly rodents, such as the long-haired rat (Rattus villosissimus), the plains rat (Pseudomys australis), the introduced house mouse (Mus musculus) and other dasyurids. In captivity it may also eat day-old chicks. Unlike other venomous snakes that strike with a single, accurate bite then retreat while waiting for the prey to die, the fierce snake subdues the prey with a series of rapid, accurate strikes. It is known to deliver up to eight venomous bites in a single attack, often snapping its jaws fiercely several times to inflict multiple punctures in the same attack. Its more risky attack strategy entails holding its prey with its body and biting it repeatedly. This injects the extremely toxic venom deep into the prey. The venom acts so rapidly that its prey does not have time to fight back.

Natural threats
The mulga snake (Pseudechis australis) is immune to most Australian snake venom, and is known to also eat young inland taipans. The perentie (Varanus giganteus) is a large monitor lizard that also shares the same habitat. As it grows large enough, it will readily tackle large venomous snakes for prey.

Interaction with humans
Many reptile keepers consider it a placid snake to work with.

Inland taipans are rarely encountered in the wild by the average person because of their remoteness and brief above-ground appearance during the day. So long as a person is not creating much vibration and noise the inland taipan may not feel alarmed or bothered by a human presence. However, caution should be exercised and a safe distance maintained as it can inflict a potentially fatal bite. The inland taipan will defend itself and strike if provoked, mishandled, or prevented from escaping. Firstly, but not always, it makes a threat display by raising its forebody in a tight low S-shaped curve with its head facing the threat. Should the person choose to ignore the warning the inland taipan will strike. It is an extremely fast and agile snake that can strike instantly with extreme accuracy, and it envenoms in almost every case.

Clinical toxinologist, venom researcher, herpetologist, and family physician Scott A. Weinstein et al. have stated in Toxicon journal (October 2017) "There have been 11 previously well-documented envenomings by O. microlepidotus, but only 2 were inflicted by wild snakes.". "When clinically indicated, prompt provision of adequate antivenom is the cornerstone of managing O. microlepidotus envenoming. Rapid application of pressure-bandage immobilization and efficient retrieval of victims envenomed in remote locales, preferably by medically well-equipped aircraft, probably improves the likelihood of a positive outcome".

Snakebite victims
A case of survival without antivenom was recorded in 1967; on 15 September, a tour guide was bitten while trying to capture a snake for a tour group in the Channel Country. He was conveyed to Broken Hill Hospital and then to Queen Elizabeth Hospital in Adelaide but was not given antivenom as he reported he was severely allergic to horse serum and believed he had been bitten by a brown snake. He spent four weeks in hospital overall—his condition likened to severe myasthenia gravis. Meanwhile, the snake had been sent to Eric Worrell, who confirmed it had been a coastal taipan. After its rediscovery in 1972, identified as an inland taipan.

In 1984 Australian toxicologist Peter Mirtschin was bitten by a 3 weeks old inland taipan. He was the first to be treated with Taipan antivenom.

In September 2012, in the small city of Kurri Kurri, New South Wales, north of Sydney, more than 1000 kilometres away from the snake's natural environment, a teenage boy was bitten on the finger by an inland taipan. The teenager's rapid self-application of a compression bandage above the wound and the availability and administration of a polyvalent (broad-spectrum) antivenom in the local hospital saved his life. The police worked to find out how the inland taipan got to this part of Australia. The snake was most likely a stolen or illegal pet and the boy had tried to feed it.

In December 2013, reptile handler Scott Grant (age 40+), who was conducting a demonstration in front of 300 people at the annual building union's picnic in Portland, Victoria, had just finished showing the crowd an inland taipan and was trying to put it into a bag when it struck him. He got into his utility and tied a bandage around his arm. A few minutes later, however, he was lying on the ground and convulsing. He was flown in a serious condition to Essendon Airport and driven to the Royal Melbourne Hospital, where his condition was stabilised and over time he recovered. Only a tiny amount of venom from the inland taipan had entered his body, and the adverse reaction he felt shortly after was an allergic one, presumably due to his past snake bites.

In October 2017, Weinstein et al. published a case report in Toxicon journal, writing "The victim was seeking to observe members of an isolated population of this species and was envenomed while attempting to photograph an approximately 1.5 m specimen. He reported feeling “drowsiness” and blurred vision that progressed to ptosis; he later developed dysphagia and dysarthria. The patient was treated with 1 vial of polyvalent antivenom, which was later followed with an additional two vials of taipan monovalent. He was intubated during retrieval, and recovered after 3 days of intensive care. He had a right ophthalmoplegia that persisted for approximately 1 week post-envenoming.".

According to Rob Bredl, a.k.a. "The Barefoot Bushman", in an isolated area of South Australia, his father, Joe Bredl, was bitten while catching an inland taipan and barely survived. A more recent victim was his friend John Robinson, bitten while cleaning an inland taipan's cage at his reptile display on the Sunshine Coast, Queensland. He weathered the bite without antivenom but sustained considerable muscle damage as well as heart damage.

Almost all positively identified inland taipan bite victims have been herpetologists handling the snakes for study or snake handlers, such as people who catch snakes to extract their venom, or keepers in wildlife parks. All were treated successfully with antivenom. No recorded incidents have been fatal since the advent of the monovalent (specific) antivenom therapy, though it can take weeks to recover from such a severe bite.

Venom
The average quantity of venom delivered by this species is 44 mg and the maximum dose recorded is 110 mg, compared to the Indian cobra (Naja naja) 169 mg/max 610 mg, and the North American eastern diamondback rattlesnake (Crotalus adamanteus) 410 mg/max 848 mg etc.

The median lethal dose (LD50), subcutaneous (the most applicable to actual bites) for mice is 0.025 mg/kg (0.01 mg/kg subcutaneous, in bovine serum albumin). Compared to the beaked sea snake (Enhydrina schistosa) 0.164 mg/kg, Indian cobra 0.565 mg/kg, North American eastern diamondback rattlesnake 11.4 mg/kg, etc., the inland taipan has a smaller venom yield than its cousin the coastal taipan yet its venom is almost four times as toxic. One bite's worth of venom is enough to kill 100 fully grown men.

Intravenous, intraperitoneal and intramuscular LD50 for the inland taipan venom have not been tested.

Belcher's sea snake (Hydrophis belcheri), which many times is mistakenly called the hook-nosed sea snake (Enhydrina schistosa), has been erroneously popularized as the most venomous snake in the world, due to Ernst and Zug's published book Snakes in Question: The Smithsonian Answer Book from 1996. Bryan Grieg Fry, a prominent venom expert, has clarified the error: "The hook-nosed myth was due to a fundamental error in a book called Snakes in Question. In there, all the toxicity testing results were lumped in together, regardless of the mode of testing (e.g. subcutaneous vs. intramuscular vs intravenous vs intraperitoneal). As the mode can influence the relative number, venoms can only be compared within a mode. Otherwise, it's apples and rocks." Belcher's sea snake's actual LD50 (recorded only intramuscularly) is 0.24 mg/kg and 0.155 mg/kg, less lethal than other sea snakes such as the olive sea snake (Aipysurus laevis) 0.09 mg/kg and the most toxic intramuscularly,  recorded of the sea snakes – the black-banded robust sea snake (Hydrophis melanosoma) 0.082 mg/kg. The black-banded robust sea snake has also been tested subcutaneously registering at 0.111 mg/kg, which is in line with the coastal taipan and thus more than four times less toxic than the inland taipan's venom. In the LD50 subcutaneous test, it is actually Dubois' sea snake (Aipysurus duboisii) which has the most toxic venom of any of the sea snakes tested, registering at 0.044 mg/kg. This is still nearly half as lethal as the inland taipan's venom.

The biological properties and toxicity of a baby inland taipan's venom are not significantly different or weaker than that of an adult's.

The inland taipan's venom consists of:
 Neurotoxins: Presynaptic neurotoxins; paradoxin (PDX), and postsynaptic neurotoxins; Oxylepitoxin-1, alpha-oxytoxin 1, alpha-scutoxin 1  – affecting the nervous system.
 Hemotoxins (procoagulants) – affecting the blood
 Myotoxins – affecting the muscles
 Possibly nephrotoxins – affecting the kidneys
 Possibly haemorrhagins – affecting the blood vessels (endothelium)
Hyaluronidase enzyme – increases the rate of absorption of venom

Paradoxin (PDX) appears to be one of the most potent, if not the most potent, beta-neurotoxin yet discovered. Beta-neurotoxins keep nerve endings from liberating the neurotransmitter acetylcholine.

According to researcher Ronelle Welton of James Cook University, the majority of components in the venom have not been characterized and little molecular research has been undertaken on taipan (Oxyuranus) species at large. As of 2005, the amino acid sequences of only seven proteins from inland taipan have been submitted to SWISS-PROT databases.

Clinical effects
The mortality rate is high in untreated cases:

 Dangerousness of bite: severe envenomation likely, high lethality potential.
 Rate of envenoming: >80% 
 Untreated lethality rate: >80%

Clinically, envenomation may represent a complex scenario of multiple organ system poisoning with neurotoxic symptoms typically dominating. Acute kidney injury, rhabdomyolysis, and disseminated coagulopathy may also complicate the setting.

The first local and general symptoms of a bite are local pain and variable non-specific effects which may include headache, nausea, vomiting, abdominal pain, diarrhoea, dizziness, collapse or convulsions leading to major organ effects: neurotoxicity, coagulopathy, rhabdomyolysis or kidney failure/damage and finally death.

Inland taipan snake venom contains potent presynaptic neurotoxins (toxins in venom that cause paralysis or muscle weakness). Also present are postsynaptic neurotoxins, which are less potent but more rapid acting than the presynaptic neurotoxins. Presynaptic neurotoxins disrupt neurotransmitter release from the axon terminal. This takes days to resolve and does not respond to antivenom. Postsynaptic neurotoxins competitively block acetylcholine receptors but the effect can be reversed by antivenom. Envenoming causes a progressive descending flaccid paralysis: ptosis is usually the first sign, then facial (dysarthria) and bulbar involvement progressing to dyspnea and respiratory paralysis leading to suffocation and peripheral weakness. Because it can act so fast, it can kill a person within about 45 minutes. There have been reports of people experiencing effects of the venom within half an hour. The development of general or respiratory paralysis is of paramount concern in that these are often difficult to reverse once established, even with large amounts of antivenom. Prolonged intubation and ventilatory support (perhaps up to a week or longer) may be required. Early diagnosis of neurotoxic symptoms with prompt and adequate dosages of antivenom is critical to avoid these complications.

The venom also contains a potent hemotoxin (procoagulants), a prothrombin activator that leads to the consumption of major coagulation factors including fibrinogen, leading to interference with blood clotting. This causes defibrination, with non-clottable blood, putting victims at risk of major bleeding from the bite site and can lead to more serious, sometimes fatal, internal haemorrhaging, especially in the brain. Recovering from this takes many hours after venom neutralisation has been achieved with antivenom. Taipan snake procoagulants are among the most powerful snake venom procoagulants known, though mild coagulopathy has also been reported for inland taipan envenomation (Sutherland and Tibballs, 2001).

No nephrotoxins (kidney toxins) have so far been isolated from inland taipan snake venoms, but renal (kidney) impairment or acute kidney failure can occur secondary to severe rhabdomyolysis.

Taipan snake venom does contain myotoxins that cause myolysis (rhabdomyolysis, muscle damage); the urine of a bite victim often turns reddish-brown as their muscles dissolve and are passed through the kidneys (myoglobinuria). The kidneys are often badly damaged by filtering so much tissue debris out of the blood, and kidney failure is a common complication in serious cases where there is significant envenoming.

Causes of death:
 Paralysis – primary, e.g., respiratory failure; secondary, e.g., pneumonia
 Coagulopathy – primary, e.g., cerebral haemorrhage; secondary, e.g., kidney failure
 Kidney failure – includes secondary complications such as infections
 Anaphylaxis  – acute allergic reaction to venom in a patient previously exposed to taipan snake venom (e.g., reptile keeper)
 Cardiac complications – likely to be secondary

Antivenom
Until 1955, the only antivenom available for general distribution for Australian snakes was the monovalent (specific) tiger snake (Notechis) antivenom, which gave varying degrees of cross-protection against the bites of most other dangerous Australian snakes. Thereafter followed specific anti-venom for other common snakes among them the coastal taipan, and finally, a polyvalent (broad spectrum) antivenom, a combined antivenom for the bites of any unidentified snake from Australia.

The coastal taipan anti-venom, known as "taipan antivenom", is effective against the inland taipan venom as well, but it is not as effective in bite victims of the inland taipan as in those of the coastal taipan.

Taipan antivenom is produced and manufactured by the Australian Reptile Park and the Commonwealth Serum Laboratories in Melbourne.

References

Further reading
Boulenger GA (1896). Catalogue of the Snakes in the British Museum (Natural History). Volume III., Containing the Colubridæ (Opisthoglyphæ and Proteroglyphæ),... London: Trustees of the British Museum. (Taylor and Francis, printers). xiv + 727 pp. + Plates I-XXV. (Pseudechis microlepidotus and P. ferox, p. 332).
McCoy F(1879). Natural History of Victoria. Prodromus of the Zoology of Victoria; or, Figures and Descriptions of the Living Species of All Classes of the Victorian Indigenous Animals. Decade III. London: G. Robertson. (J. Ferres, government printer, Melbourne). 50 pp. + Plates 21–30. (Diemenia microlepidota, new species, pp. 12–13 + Plate 23, Figures 2–3).

External links
 
 
 International Programme on Chemical Safety, Oxyuranus microlepidotus: Extended Review
 James Cook University, Proteomic and genomic characterisation of venom proteins from Oxyuranus species (Extended Review)
 Australian Reptile Park, Fierce Snake Fact File
 Australia Zoo Fierce Snake Fact File
  ContentMint (Source:Absolutely Wild Visuals, stock footage library )

Oxyuranus
Reptiles of Queensland
Reptiles described in 1879
Citation overkill
Reptiles of South Australia
Snakes of Australia